Aramil is a Spanish parroquia of Siero, in Asturias. It has a population of 347 inhabitants (INE 2011) in 173 homes. It is located 5 km from the capital, Pola de Siero, in the eastern part of the council. It has a boundary on the northwest with the parish of Marcenado and Collado; to the east with Feleches; and to the south and southwest with Santa Eulalia de Vigil. The Romanesque church of Church of San Esteban de Aramil is located in the town.

Towns 
As of  2011, it was populated by several towns:
 La Barreona
 Castiello
 Cuartes
 Pedraces
 La Quintana
 Rebollada
 El Rincón
 San Roque
 Tabladiello

References 

Parishes in Siero